Shape notes are a musical notation designed to facilitate congregational and social singing.  The notation, introduced in late 18th century England, became a popular teaching device in American singing schools. Shapes were added to the noteheads in written music to help singers find pitches within major and minor scales without the use of more complex information found in key signatures on the staff.

Shape notes of various kinds have been used for over two centuries in a variety of music traditions, mostly sacred music but also secular, originating in New England, practiced primarily in the Southern United States for many years, and now experiencing a renaissance in other locations as well.

Nomenclature 
Shape notes have also been called character notes and patent notes, respectfully, and buckwheat notes and dunce notes, pejoratively.

Overview 
The idea behind shape notes is that the parts of a vocal work can be learned more quickly and easily if the music is printed in shapes that match up with the solfège syllables with which the notes of the musical scale are sung.  For instance, in the four-shape tradition used in the Sacred Harp and elsewhere, the notes of a C major scale are notated and sung as follows:

A skilled singer experienced in a shape note tradition has developed a fluent triple mental association, which links a note of the scale, a shape, and a syllable.  This association can be used to help in reading the music.
When a song is first sung by a shape note group, they normally sing the syllables (reading them from the shapes) to solidify their command over the notes.  Next, they sing the same notes to the words of the music.

The syllables and notes of a shape note system are relative rather than absolute; they depend on the key of the piece. The first note of a major key always has the triangular Fa note, followed (ascending) by Sol, La, etc. The first note of a minor key is always La, followed by Mi, Fa, etc.

The first three notes of any major scale – fa, sol, la – are each a tone apart. The fourth to sixth notes are also a tone apart and are also fa, sol, la. The seventh and eighth notes, being separated by a semitone, are indicated mi-fa.  This means that just four shapenotes can adequately reflect the "feeling" of the whole scale.

Four-shape vs. seven-shape systems

The system illustrated above is a four-shape system; six of the notes of the scale are grouped in pairs assigned to one syllable/shape combination.  The ascending scale using the fa, so, la, fa, so, la, mi, fa syllables represent a variation of the hexachord system introduced by the 11th century monk Guido of Arezzo, who originally introduced a six-note scale using the syllables ut, re, mi, fa, sol, la.

The four syllable variation of Guido's original system was prominent in 17th century England, and entered the US in the 18th century. Shortly afterward, shapes were invented to represent the syllables. (see below).  The other important systems are seven-shape systems, which give a different shape and syllable to every note of the scale.  Such systems use as their syllables the note names "do, re, mi, fa, so, la, ti, do" (familiar to most people due to the song "Do-Re-Mi" from The Sound of Music).  A few books (e.g. "The Good Old Songs" by C. H. Cayce) present the older seven-note syllabification of "do, re, mi, fa, so, la, si, do". In the seven-shape system invented by Jesse B. Aikin, the notes of a C major scale would be notated and sung as follows:

There are other seven-shape systems.

Effectiveness of shape notes
A controlled study on the usefulness of shape notes was carried out in the 1950s by George H. Kyme with an experimental population consisting of fourth- and fifth-graders living in California. Kyme took care to match his experimental and control groups as closely as possible for ability, quality of teacher, and various other factors. He found that the students taught with shape notes learned to sight read significantly better than those taught without them. Kyme additionally found that the students taught with shape notes were also far more likely to pursue musical activities later on in their education.

Shape notes and modulation
Many forms of music in the common practice period employ modulation, that is, a change of key in mid-piece. Since the 19th century, most choral music has employed modulation, and since the key change is easy for instruments but difficult for singers, the new tonality is usually established by instrumental accompaniment; accordingly, the choir will also sing in the temperament of the instrument rather than the just intonation of the human voice. Modulation is sometimes said to be problematic for shape-note systems, since the shapes employed for the original key of the piece no longer match the scale degrees of the new key;  but the ability to use of sharp and flat symbols along with shape notes is a matter of the range of sorts available to the typographer and musical preferences. The development of musical preferences is partly documented by surviving copies of B.F. White's Organ from the 1850s.

Justin Morgan's "Judgment Anthem," which first appeared in shapes in Little and Smith's The Easy Instructor (1801), appears to shift keys (and key signatures) from E minor to E♭ major, then back to E minor before concluding in E♭ major. Morgan, however, may be supposed to have intended simply a shift from major to minor while maintaining the same tonic pitch. It was reprinted in many of the early shape note tunebooks, but not in the Sacred Harp (1844), in which Jeremiah Ingalls's "Christian Song" is the only song that modulates (in this case, from D minor to D major).

Origin and early history 

As noted above, the syllables of shape-note systems greatly antedate the shapes.  The practice of singing music to syllables designating pitch goes back to about AD 1000 with the work of Guido of Arezzo. Other early work in this area includes the cipher notation of Jean-Jacques Rousseau (18th century), and the tonic sol-fa of Sarah Anna Glover and John Curwen (19th century).

American forerunners to shape notes include the 9th edition of the Bay Psalm Book (Boston), and An Introduction to the Singing of Psalm Tunes in a Plaine & Easy Method by Reverend John Tufts.  The 9th edition of the Bay Psalm Book was printed with the initials of four-note syllables (fa, sol, la, me) underneath the staff. In his book, Tufts substituted the initials of the four-note syllables on the staff in place of note heads, and indicated rhythm by punctuation marks to the right of the letters.

Compositions of the "Yankee tunesmiths" ("First New England School") began to appear in 1770, prior to the advent of shape notes, which first appeared in The Easy Instructor by William Little and William Smith in 1801 in Philadelphia. Little and Smith introduced the four-shape system shown above, intended for use in singing schools. In 1803 Andrew Law published The Musical Primer, which used slightly different shapes:  a square indicated fa and a triangle la, while sol and mi were the same as in Little and Smith. Additionally, Law's invention was more radical than Little and Smith's in that he dispensed with the use of the staff altogether, letting the shapes be the sole means of expressing pitch. Little and Smith followed traditional music notation in placing the note heads on the staff, in place of the ordinary oval note heads. In the end, it was the Little/Smith system that won out, and there is no hymnbook used today that employs the Law system.

Some copies of The Easy Instructor, Part II (1803) included a statement, on the verso of the title page, in which John Connelly (whose name is given in other sources as Conly, Connolly, and Coloney) grants permission to Little and Smith to make use in their publications of the shape notes to which he claimed the rights. Little and Smith did not themselves claim credit for the invention, but said instead that the notes were invented around 1790 by John Connelly of Philadelphia, Pennsylvania. Andrew Law asserted that he was the inventor of shape notes.

Shape notes proved popular in America, and quickly a wide variety of hymnbooks were prepared making use of them.  The shapes were eventually extirpated in the northeastern U.S. by a so-called "better music" movement, headed by Lowell Mason.  But in the South, the shapes became well entrenched, and multiplied into a variety of traditions. Ananias Davisson's Kentucky Harmony (1816) is the first Southern shape-note tunebook, and was soon followed by Alexander Johnson's Tennessee Harmony (1818), Allen D. Carden's The Missouri Harmony (1820) and many others.

Rise of seven-shape systems
By the middle of the 19th century, the "fa so la" system of four syllables had acquired a major rival, namely the seven-syllable "do re mi" system.  Thus, music compilers began to add three more shapes to their books to match the extra syllables.  Numerous seven-shape notations were devised. Jesse B. Aikin was the first to produce a book with a seven-shape note system, and he vigorously defended his "invention" and his patent. The system used in Aikin's 1846 Christian Minstrel eventually became the standard.  This owes much to the influential Ruebush & Kieffer Publishing Company adopting Aikin's system around 1876.  Two books that have remained in continuous (though limited) use, William Walker's Christian Harmony and M. L. Swan's New Harp of Columbia, are still available.  These books use seven-shape systems devised by Walker and Swan, respectively.

Currently active shape note traditions 

Although seven-shape books may not be as popular as in the past, there are still a great number of churches in the American South, in particular Southern Baptists, Primitive Baptists, almost all of the non-instrumental Churches of Christ, some Free Methodists, Mennonite, some Amish, United Pentecostals, and United Baptists in the Appalachian regions of West Virginia, Ohio and Kentucky, that regularly use seven-shape songbooks in Sunday worship. These songbooks may contain a variety of songs from 18th-century classics to 20th-century gospel music.  Thus today denominational songbooks printed in seven shapes probably constitute the largest branch of the shape-note tradition.

In addition, nondenominational community singings are also intermittently held which feature early- to mid-20th century seven-shape gospel music such as Stamps-Baxter hymnals or Heavenly Highway. In these traditions, the custom of "singing the notes" (syllables) is generally preserved only during the learning process at singing schools and singing may be to an instrumental accompaniment, typically a piano.

The seven-shape system is also still used at regular public singings of 19th-century songbooks of a similar type to the Sacred Harp, such as The Christian Harmony and the New Harp of Columbia.  Such singings are common in Georgia, North Carolina, Tennessee, Mississippi, and Alabama, and generally preserve the singing school custom of "singing the notes".

The seven-shape (Aikin) system is commonly used by the Mennonites and Brethren. Numerous songbooks are printed in shaped notes for this market.  They include Christian Hymnal, the Christian Hymnary, Hyms of the Church, Zion's Praises, Pilgrim's Praises, the Church Hymnal, Silver Gems in Song, the Mennonite Hymnal, and Harmonia Sacra.

Some African-American churches use the seven-shape note system.

The four-shape tradition that currently has the greatest number of participants is Sacred Harp singing.  But there are many other traditions that are still active or even enjoying a resurgence of interest.  Among the four-shape systems, the Southern Harmony has remained in continuous use at one singing in Benton, Kentucky, and is now experiencing a small amount of regrowth.  The current reawakening of interest in shape note singing has also created new singings using other recently moribund 19th-century four-shape songbooks, such as The Missouri Harmony, as well as new books by modern composers, such as the Northern Harmony. Of a hybrid nature, in terms of reviving Ananias Davisson's Kentucky Harmony but taking the further step of incorporating songs from 70 other early tunebooks, along with new compositions, is the Shenandoah Harmony (2013). Thomas B. Malone has specialized in the revival of works by Jeremiah Ingalls, and has published a four-shape edition of Ingalls' 1805 The Christian Harmony.  Malone organizes an annual mid-July singing in Newbury, Vermont, where Ingalls was a tavern-keeper and musician between 1789 and 1810.

See also
Fuguing tune
Southern gospel
West gallery music

Notes

References

Bibliography

Books
 .
 .
Drummond, R. Paul (n.d.) A Portion for the Singers: A History of Music Among Primitive Baptists Since 1800.
Eastburn, Kathryn (n.d.) A Sacred Feast: Reflections on Sacred Harp Singing and Dinner on the Ground.

 
 .
 .
 .
 .
 , xxxvii, 346 pp.

Journal articles
  investigates the internal debate among shape note singers at the end of the 19th century and beginning of the twentieth.

External links

Archived at Ghostarchive and the Wayback Machine: 
Fasola Home Page – web site of the Sacred Harp Musical Heritage Association, dedicated to Sacred Harp and Shapenote singing
Awake, My Soul – about a documentary movie The Story of Sacred Harp and Shaped Note singing
Shape Note Historical Background – article on the evolution of shaped notes
Shape Notes: the eight note, seven shape method – article promoting the seven shape method
Shape-note Connexion & music of Jeremiah Ingalls where you can hear a fine example of shapenote singing, including the first run-through with the shapenote syllables being sung
 With lesson plans for teachers.
Sacred Harp Music – article on Sacred Harp from the Handbook of Texas online
Mississippi's African American Shape Note Tradition article by Chiquita Walls
Pearl River South Singing Convention
Stamps-Baxter School of Gospel Music –  school furthering the Stamps and Baxter tradition
UK Sacred Harp and Shapenote Singing – official UK site with events calendar, resources and contacts for all UK shapenote groups
Sacred Harp and Related Shape-Note Music Resources – an extensive site of resources concerning Sacred Harp, other Shape-Note music, Gallery music, etc.
Singing with Sol-fa Syllables – article about singing schools and shape notes
The Shape of Music – book on teaching small children shapenote singing.
Where Could I Go But To The Lord field recording from the Florida Folklife Collection
Art of the States: shape-note recordings
Sacred Harp.mus.  Electronic sound files of songs from several 19th century shapenote songbooks using Melody Assistant software.
Seven-Shape Note Sheet Music  Open Hymnal Round Notes converted to Seven-Shape Notes.
Seven-Shape Note Book  Cyber Hymnal Selection converted to Seven-Shape Notes Book.
Singings from the Shenandoah Harmony  List of all-day and regular local singings from the Shenandoah Harmony.

Public-domain shape-note tunebooks
4-shape notation tunebooks on IMSLP
7-shape notation tunebooks on IMSLP
 The Methodist Harmonist (1833)
 .
  (at IMSLP).
 .
 Allen D. Carden, The Missouri Harmony (1834)
 W. L. Chappell, The Western Lyre, new edition (1835)
 David Clayton and James Carrell, The Virginia Harmony (1831)
 Ananias Davisson, A Supplement to the Kentucky Harmony (1825, reset 2011)
 Joseph Funk and sons, The New Harmonia Sacra: A Compilation of Genuine Church Music (1915, 18th edition, 7-shape), (2008, 26th edition, 7-shape and 4-shape)
 William Hauser, The Hesperian Harp (1848) 
 The Christian Harp and Sabbath School Songster (1870),  (7-shape)
 J. S. James, Union Harp and History of Songs (1909)
William Little and William Smith, The Easy Instructor (1801), Part 2 (1803)
 Lowell Mason, Mason's Sacred Harp (1835 and 1844 editions)
 John G. McCurry, The Social Harp (1855)
 William Walker, The Southern Harmony, and Musical Companion (1847), (1854); The Southern and Western Pocket Harmony, intended as an Appendix to the Southern Harmony (1860)
 B. F. White, The Sacred Harp (1860) (c. 2), (1911, rev. J. S. James et al.)
 Wyeth's Repository of Sacred Music (1826)

 
American styles of music
Christian music
Christian music genres
Musical notation
Sacred Harp